Phytoecia pauliraputii is a species of beetle in the family Cerambycidae. It was described by Sama in 1993. It is known from Turkey.

References

Phytoecia
Beetles described in 1993